Castellitto is an Italian surname. Notable people with the surname include:

Pietro Castellitto (born 1991), Italian actor, film director, and screenwriter, son of Sergio
Sergio Castellitto (born 1953), Italian actor, film director, and screenwriter

Italian-language surnames